The Latvian-Estonian Basketball League is the highest professional men's club basketball league in Latvia and Estonia; it has been organised since 2018, run by the Latvian Basketball Association and the Estonian Basketball Association.

History 
The league was established in 2018 when the Latvijas Basketbola līga (LBL) and Korvpalli Meistriliiga (KML) merged. In its inaugural season, 15 teams participated in the league. After a Final Four is played to determine the winner of the league, there are playoffs to decide the national champions of Latvia and Estonia. The first game was on 28 September 2018, with Estonian champions Kalev/Cramo hosting a game against the Latvian champions Ventspils. On 9 April 2019, Ventspils won the first league championship. On November 19, 2021 at a meeting in Pärnu, representatives of the Latvian and Estonian Basketball Association agreed to continue the development of a joint league for the next three years. Both parties acknowledged that the Pafbet Latvian-Estonian Basketball League promotes the development of players and coaches, attracts basketball fans and inspires young people to focus on basketball.

In June 2022, Ukrainian club BC Prometey joined the league as the Ukrainian SuperLeague was suspended due to the 2022 Russian invasion of Ukraine. The team will play its home games in Riga.

Title sponsorships
Since inaugural season in 2018 the League has had title sponsorship rights sold to two companies, most recently to Paf betting company.

Competition format 
The competition follows a double round-robin format. During the course of a season each club plays each other club twice (once at home and once away). Teams' rankings at season end are determined by winning percentage. At season end, the eight top teams play-off, pitting the first place standings team against the 8th place team, and so on. The play-off format initially was supposed to be Quarterfinals and Final Four, but since the inaugural season it has changed every season.

Home Grown Player Rule
A foreign player (not Latvian or Estonian) who has been registered and played in the Latvian National Championship or the Estonian National Championship for three consecutive seasons between the ages of 12 and 19 is considered to be a local player.

Current clubs 

16 teams, 9 from Estonia, 6 from Latvia and 1 from Ukraine, is contesting the league in the 2022–23 season.

Venues and locations

Champions

Performance by club

References

External links
Official website

1
1
2018 establishments in Europe
Sports leagues established in 2018